Alcine (English: Alcina) is an opera by the French composer André Campra. It takes the form of a tragédie en musique in a prologue and five acts. The libretto, by Antoine Danchet, is based on cantos IV, VI and VII of Ariosto's epic poem Orlando furioso and tells of the love of the enchantress Alcine for the paladin Astolphe (Astolfo).

Performance history

Alcine was first performed on 15 January 1705 by the Académie royale de musique at the Théâtre du Palais-Royal in Paris. The opera was a failure at its first performance.

Roles

Sources

Further reading
Alcine, Tragédie; représentée pour la prémiere fois par l'Académie Royale de Musique, Le Quinziéme jour de Janvier 1705, Paris, Ballard, 1705 (original libretto) Gallica, Bibliothèque Nationale de France
Alcine, tragédie mise en musique par Mr Campra (Partition in Folio), Paris, H. de Baussen, 1705 (original score)  Gallica, Bibliothèque Nationale de France
The Viking Opera Guide, ed. Amanda Holden (Viking, 1993)
Le magazine de l'opéra baroque

Tragédies en musique
Operas by André Campra
French-language operas
Operas
Opera world premieres at the Paris Opera
Operas based on works by Ludovico Ariosto
1705 operas